The 2018 Swedish Open (also known as the SkiStar Swedish Open for sponsorship reasons) was a tennis tournament played on outdoor clay courts as part of the ATP World Tour 250 Series of the 2018 ATP World Tour. It took place in Båstad, Sweden, from 15 through 22 July 2018. The women's tournament was discontinued this year and replaced by the Moscow River Cup.

Singles main-draw entrants

Seeds 

 1 Rankings are as of July 2, 2018

Other entrants 
The following players received wildcards into the singles main draw:
  Jaume Munar
  Casper Ruud
  Mikael Ymer

The following players received entry from the qualifying draw:
  Simone Bolelli
  Zdeněk Kolář
  Juan Ignacio Londero
  Corentin Moutet

The following player received entry as a lucky loser:
  Henri Laaksonen

Withdrawals 
  Nicolás Kicker → replaced by  Thiago Monteiro
  Viktor Troicki → replaced by  Henri Laaksonen
  Stefanos Tsitsipas → replaced by  Lorenzo Sonego
  Stan Wawrinka → replaced by  Gerald Melzer

Doubles main-draw entrants

Seeds 

 Rankings are as of July 2, 2018

Other entrants 
The following pairs received wildcards into the doubles main draw:
  Markus Eriksson /  Andreas Siljeström
  Elias Ymer /  Mikael Ymer

Champions

Singles 

 Fabio Fognini def.  Richard Gasquet, 6–3, 3–6, 6–1

Doubles 

 Julio Peralta /  Horacio Zeballos def.  Simone Bolelli /  Fabio Fognini, 6–3, 6–4

References

External links 

 

Swedish Open
Swedish Open
Swedish Open
July 2018 sports events in Sweden